David Janin (born 9 May 1977 in Tremblay-en-France, France) is a French rugby union footballer.

He was selected for France in their 2008 Tour to Australia. His Test debut came against the Australia at Sydney on 28 June 2008.

External links

French rugby union players
Living people
Rugby union wings
France international rugby union players
1977 births